Barbara von Absberg was abbess of Obermünster (higher monastery) in Regensburg from 1435 to 1456.

Family 
Barbara von Absberg was a member of the noble family House of Absberg.
Her siblings were Georg, Walburga and Hans. Her sister Walburga lived in Niedermünster (lower monastery). According to Biedermann, Barbara was also abbess of Niedermünster. She probably died in 1456, because an abbess usually served for life. A close relative, Henry IV of Absberg, was from 1465 bishop of Regensburg.

Literature 
 Johann Gottfried Biedermann: Geschlechtsregister Der Reichsfrey unmittelbaren Ritterschaft Landes zu Franken Löblichen Orts an der Altmühl.... Bayreuth 1748. chart CLXX.
 Helmut Rischert: Die Burgen im Anlautertal II: Burgruine Rumburg, in: Sammelblatt des Historischen Vereins Eichstätt 76 (1983), p. 6–34.

See also
Catholic Church in Germany

References

German Roman Catholic abbesses
15th-century German nuns
Year of birth missing
Year of death missing
Barbara